Salt pork is salt-cured pork. It is particularly good when prepared from pork belly, or, more rarely, fatback. Salt pork typically resembles uncut side bacon, but is fattier, being made from the lowest part of the belly, and saltier, as the cure is stronger and performed for longer, and never smoked. 

Along with hardtack, salt pork was a standard ration for many militaries and navies throughout the 17th, 18th, and 19th centuries, seeing usage in the American Civil War, War of 1812, and the Napoleonic Wars, among others. Salt pork now finds use in traditional American cuisine, particularly Boston baked beans, pork and beans, and to add its flavor to vegetables cooked in water, as with greens in soul food. It is also central to the flavoring of clam chowder. It generally is cut and cooked (blanched or rendered) before use, however it can be also eaten without prior heat treatment.

Salt pork that contains a significant amount of meat, resembling standard side bacon, is known as "streak o' lean". It is traditionally popular in the Southeastern United States. As a stand-alone food product, it is typically boiled to remove much of the salt content and to partially cook the product, then fried until it starts to develop a crisp exterior.  It may be eaten as one would eat bacon, or used to season other dishes like traditional salt pork.

See also

References

Pork
Charcuterie
Food preservation
Military food
Maritime culture